The curling competitions of the 2022 Winter Olympics were held at the Beijing National Aquatics Centre, one of the Olympic Green venues. Curling competitions were scheduled for every day of the games, from February 2 to February 20. This was the eighth time that curling was part of the Olympic program.

In each of the men's, women's, and mixed doubles competitions, 10 nations competed. The mixed doubles competition was expanded for its second appearance in the Olympics. A total of 120 quota spots (60 per sex) were distributed to the sport of curling, an increase of four from the 2018 Winter Olympics. A total of 3 events were contested, one for men, one for women, and one mixed.

Qualification

Qualification to the Men's and Women's curling tournaments at the Winter Olympics was determined through two methods (in addition to the host nation). Nations qualified teams by placing in the top six at the 2021 World Curling Championships. Teams could also qualify through Olympic qualification events which were held in 2021. Six nations qualified via World Championship qualification placement, while three nations qualified through qualification events. In men's and women's play, a host will be selected for the Olympic Qualification Event (OQE). They would be joined by the teams which competed at the 2021 World Championships but did not qualify for the Olympics, and two qualifiers from the Pre-Olympic Qualification Event (Pre-OQE). The Pre-OQE was open to all member associations.

For the mixed doubles competition in 2022, the tournament field was expanded from eight competitor nations to ten. The top seven ranked teams at the 2021 World Mixed Doubles Curling Championship qualified, along with two teams from the Olympic Qualification Event (OQE) – Mixed Doubles. This OQE was open to a nominated host and the fifteen nations with the highest qualification points not already qualified to the Olympics. As the host nation, China qualified teams automatically, thus making a total of ten teams per event in the curling tournaments.

Summary

Competition schedule

Curling competitions started two days before the Opening Ceremony and finished on the last day of the games, meaning the sport was the only one to have had a competition every day of the games. The following was the competition schedule for the curling competitions:

Medal summary

Medal table

Medalists

Teams

Men

Women

Mixed doubles

Results summary

Men's tournament

Round robin
Standings

Results

Playoffs

Semifinals
Thursday, 17 February, 20:05

Bronze medal game
Friday, 18 February, 14:05

Gold medal game
Saturday, 19 February, 14:50

Women's tournament

Round robin
Standings

Results

Playoffs

Semifinals
Friday, 18 February, 20:05

Bronze medal game
Saturday, 19 February, 20:05

Gold medal game
Sunday, 20 February, 9:05

Mixed doubles tournament

Round robin
Standings

Results

Playoffs

Semifinals
Monday, 7 February, 20:05

Bronze medal game
Tuesday, 8 February, 14:05

Gold medal game
Tuesday, 8 February, 20:05

Participating nations
A total of 114 athletes from 14 nations (including the IOC's designation of ROC) were scheduled to participate (the numbers of athletes are shown in parentheses). Some curlers competed in both the 4-person and mixed doubles tournament, therefore, the numbers included on this list are the total athletes sent by each NOC to the Olympics, not how many athletes they qualified. Both Australia and the Czech Republic made their Olympic sport debuts.

References

External links
Official Results Book – Curling

 
2022 Winter Olympics events
Winter Olympics
2022 Winter Olympics